Ghosts on the Loose is a 1943 American comedy horror film and the fourteenth film in the East Side Kids series, directed by William Beaudine. The picture co-stars horror film icon Bela Lugosi as well as Ava Gardner in one of her earliest roles.

The film was released in the United Kingdom as Ghosts in the Night.

Plot
When Glimpy's sister, Betty, marries Jack, Muggs singlehandedly organizes the wedding. The gang provide a choral version of "Drink to Me Only with Thine Eyes" as well as organ music. Scruno, Stash, and Benny  provide a floral centerpiece by "borrowing" a funeral wreath meant for a murdered gangster's funeral on the morrow. Danny and Rocky also borrow the deceased gangster's tuxedo prior to his funeral for Glimpy who is the best man. Scruno's mother provides rice to throw that she has cooked to make extra soft. Muggs also organizes a police escort by telling the police gangsters will try to break up the wedding with Glimpy adlibbing they are the notorious Katzman Gang, (the producer of the film series).

On this happy day only one thing is slightly bothering Jack: the house he has purchased is well below the market value due to rumors that the house next door is a haunted house. The house next door is actually used by a Nazi German spy ring, led by Emil. Emil is furious that his minion has sold the neighboring house to Jack, as it will be needed for future activities as both houses are connected by secret tunnels. Emil orders his minion, Tony, to buy it back from Jack.

Jack is mystified by the reasons for the house being wanted by another party. Jack does accept the money for the sale where the minion gives him a note with the address of the neighboring "haunted" house where he can be reached.

On his way to their honeymoon Jack drops the note with the address of the neighboring house. Muggs picks up the address thinking it is the house that Jack and Betty are moving into and decides to surprise the couple by having the gang clean and tidy the house before the couple arrive.

At the Honeymoon Hotel Jack is given an urgent message to contact the party who originally sold him the house. The wife is worried about the strange activities in the house next door to the house Jack bought leading to the haunted rumors. She wishes to warn Jack and she also telephones the police to investigate. Jack and Betty drive to their house to get to the bottom of the rumors.

When the gang goes to the wrong house that is occupied by the Nazi spies, Emil and his gang pull out all stops to scare the boys into believing the house is haunted.  The scheme backfires when the boys hide in the cellar where they discover a printing press with leaflets from the New Order entitled "How to destroy the Allies". As Jack and Betty and the police arrive the gang takes on Emil and his spy ring and wins.

In the end, Betty, Jack, and the East Side Kids are all forced to spend the newlyweds' honeymoon stuck in their new home, under quarantine, when Glimpy comes down with German measles (his face is decorated with swastikas).

Cast

The East Side Kids
 Leo Gorcey as Muggs
 Huntz Hall as Glimpy
 Bobby Jordan as Danny
 Sammy Morrison as Scruno
 Billy Benedict as Benny (a.k.a. Skinny)
 Stanley Clements as Stash
 Bobby Stone as Dave (a.k.a. Rocky)
 Bill Bates as Sleepy (a.k.a. Dave)

Additional cast
 Bela Lugosi as Emil
 Ava Gardner as Betty
 Rick Vallin as Jack
 Minerva Urecal as Hilda
 Wheeler Oakman as Tony
 Peter Seal as Bruno
 Frank Moran as Monk
 Jack Mulhall as Lieutenant
 Harry Depp as John G. Elwood (uncredited)
 Tom Herbert as Park Central Plaza Desk Clerk (uncredited)
 Robert F. Hill as Minister at Wedding (uncredited)
 Eddie Laughton as Wedding Usher (uncredited)
 Kay Marvis as Bridesmaid (uncredited)
 Ray Miller as Police Officer Mulligan (uncredited)
 Blanche Payson as Mrs. John G. Elwood (uncredited)
 Snub Pollard as Flower Delivery Man (uncredited)

Production
The film was originally called Ghosts in the Night, which had also been the working title for Spooks Run Wild, the first time Lugosi worked with the East Side Kids. The film was a "special" from Monogram. They borrowed Ava Gardner from MGM (then best known as having been married to Mickey Rooney) to play the female lead.

Filming began February 8, 1943. Exactly ten days earlier, producer Jack Dietz was sentenced to seven months in jail for tax evasion. The title was changed to Ghosts on the Loose in April 1943.

 Later on in the film, when The East Side Kids, Rick Vallin, and Ava Gardner are waiting for the cops, Muggs says, "They should be here any minute". Glimpy responds by saying, "Who?", to which Muggs says, "Oh, he's on first". This is an obvious reference to the old vaudeville routine "Who's on First?", which had been done on stage by numerous comedians over the years but had been made famous during this period by Abbott and Costello.
 Muggs makes reference to "The Katzman Mob," a jokey hat-tip to producer Sam Katzman.
 Set in the United States home front during World War II, Muggs accuses Scruno of having hallucinations due to drinking too much coffee. Glimpy eagerly asks "Where did you get it?" due to the rationing of coffee from 1942 onwards.
 This was Bill Bates' only East Side Kids film.
 Last official East Side Kids film for Bobby Jordan (Danny), "Sunshine Sammy" Morrison (Scruno), and Stanley Clements (Stash). Jordan would later make a guest appearance as himself in the East Side Kids film Bowery Champs, and would eventually rejoin the group for the first eight films in the series The Bowery Boys. Morrison would return briefly as 'Scruno' in Follow the Leader (his scenes were actually unused footage from a previous East Side Kids film). Clements would not work with the boys again until 1956, when he was brought in to replace Leo Gorcey as the leader of The Bowery Boys.
 Gabriel Dell and Dave Durand are absent.
 Leo Gorcey's wife Kay Marvis appears as a bridesmaid during the wedding scenes.
 "The East Side Kids" were characters in a series of films released by Monogram Pictures from 1940 through 1945.  Many of them were originally part of The Dead End Kids and The Little Tough Guys, and several of them later became members of The Bowery Boys.

Reception
The Los Angeles Times called the film "a feeble and cheaply produced bit of unenticing nothingness."

Soundtrack
 Bill Bates and sung by The East Side Kids – "Drink to Me Only with Thine Eyes" (Music by R. Melish, lyrics (poem "To Celia" by Ben Jonson))
 Bill Bates – "Bridal Chorus (Here Comes the Bride)" from Lohengrin (Written by Richard Wagner)
 Bill Bates – "The Wedding March" from ''A Midsummer Night's Dream, Op.61" (Written by Felix Mendelssohn-Bartholdy)

References

External links

 
 
 
 
 

1943 films
American spy films
1940s comedy horror films
American black-and-white films
American comedy horror films
1940s English-language films
Films directed by William Beaudine
Monogram Pictures films
1940s spy comedy films
American haunted house films
Films produced by Sam Katzman
1940s supernatural films
1943 horror films
1943 comedy films
East Side Kids
1940s American films